Julio Rubén Mayora Pernia (born 2 September 1996) is a Venezuelan weightlifter, Olympian, Pan American Champion and Pan American Games Champion competing in the 69 kg category until 2018 and the 67 kg and 73 kg categories starting in 2018 after the International Weightlifting Federation reorganized the categories.

Career
He participated at the 2018 World Weightlifting Championships, winning a bronze medal with a 322 kg total. At the 2020 Olympic Games in Tokyo he won a silver medal in the 73 kg category, and dedicated it to Hugo Chávez.

Major results

References

External links 
 

1996 births
Living people
Venezuelan male weightlifters
World Weightlifting Championships medalists
Pan American Games medalists in weightlifting
Pan American Games gold medalists for Venezuela
Weightlifters at the 2019 Pan American Games
Central American and Caribbean Games medalists in weightlifting
Central American and Caribbean Games gold medalists for Venezuela
Competitors at the 2018 Central American and Caribbean Games
Medalists at the 2019 Pan American Games
Pan American Weightlifting Championships medalists
Weightlifters at the 2020 Summer Olympics
Medalists at the 2020 Summer Olympics
Olympic medalists in weightlifting
Olympic silver medalists for Venezuela
Olympic weightlifters of Venezuela
South American Games gold medalists for Venezuela
South American Games medalists in weightlifting
Competitors at the 2022 South American Games
21st-century Venezuelan people